Alexandra Morgenrood (born 13 August 1940) is a Zimbabwean diver. She competed in the women's 3 metre springboard event at the 1960 Summer Olympics.

References

1940 births
Living people
Zimbabwean female divers
Olympic divers of Rhodesia
Divers at the 1960 Summer Olympics
Sportspeople from Harare